A bow echo is the characteristic radar return from a mesoscale convective system that is shaped like an archer's bow.  These systems can produce severe straight-line winds and occasionally tornadoes, causing major damage. They can also become derechos or form Line echo wave pattern (LEWP).

Research

The term "bow echo" was first used by Theodore Fujita in his May 1978 paper "Manual of Downburst Identification for Project NIMROD."  In 2004, research was done to better anticipate the formation of bow echoes, specifically the formation of bow echoes from weakly organized squall lines and supercells.  Researchers determined that bow echoes were most likely to occur in weakly organized cells.  A Midwest Bow Echo Workshop was held in 2007, at which meteorologists gathered to share their research to better understand bow echoes.

Formation

A bow echo is associated with squall lines or lines of convective thunderstorms.  These echoes can range in size from 20 to 200 km, and have a life span of 3 to 6 hours.  Bow echoes tend to develop when moderate to strong wind shear exists in the lower 2 to 3 km of the atmosphere.  While similar to squall lines, bow echoes are smaller in scale and are moved by the wind inside them. They tend to push outward and after time die out. A bow echo also lowers the chance of a tornado being formed in the storm itself.  The "bow shaped" echo is a result of focusing of the strong flow at the rear of the system.  Especially strong bow echoes that cause devastating damage all along the width of the storm are often called derechos.

Rear inflow jet

The formation of a bow echo requires a strong elevated rear inflow jet at mid-levels.  The strength of the cold pool and mesohigh at the surface as well as warmer temperatures aloft due to convection works to create a mesolow at mid-levels which strengthens the jet.  Upon reaching the edge of the convection the jet descends and spreads along the surface, generating straight-line winds.

Book end vortices

After the rear inflow jet has bowed the storm system, book end or line end vortices develop on either side of the jet.  These vortices are similar in strength.  Due to the small size of the bow echo, the vortices help enhance the mid-level flow between them, which strengthens the rear inflow jet.  The surface winds increase from the descending jet.  As the life of the storm increases, the Coriolis force acts to intensify the cyclonic vortex and weaken the anticyclonic vortex.  The system then develops an asymmetric comma-shaped echo.  Some embedded tornadoes or gustnadoes develop within these vortices.

Strongest winds

Damaging straight-line winds often occur near the center of a bow echo. Damage from all severe thunderstorm winds accounts for half of all severe reports in the lower 48 states of the US, and is more common than damage from tornadoes. In a type of long-lived and powerful bow echo known as a derecho, wind speeds can reach up to or exceed 100 mph (160 km/h) and can produce a damage path extending for hundreds of miles.  Bow echoes are capable of producing straight-line winds that are just as strong as many tornadoes.  Indeed, a strong bow echo will produce more widespread and intense damage than the majority of tornadoes. Also, bow echoes in the form of a line echo wave pattern create a favorable environment for tornadoes to form.

The semiarid climate and rugged terrain in the interior west of the United States do not favour the development of bow echoes. However, on 21 April 2011, a bow echo associated with a fast-moving mid-tropospheric perturbation formed across the Great Salt Lake (GSL) in Utah, producing damaging winds along its path.

Notable bow echo storms

In 1674, the city of Utrecht in the Netherlands was devastated by a storm now thought to have been a bow echo storm.  Some of the damage to the city is still visible, and severe storm activity was recorded across other areas of Europe.

See also 
 Convective storm detection
 Derecho
 Gustnado
 Hook echo
 Mesoscale convective system
 Outflow boundary
 Rear-inflow jet
 Tornado

References

External links 
 Manual of downburst identification for Project NIMROD (NASA Technical Reports Server) (May 1978)
 The Structure and Evolution of Squall Line and Bow Echo Convective Systems (NWS)
 Bow Echo Prototype (SPC)
 What Creates a Bow Echo?
 Glossary of Meteorology
 Midwest Bow Echo Workshop
 The Bow Echo and MCV Experiment: Observations and Opportunities (BAMS)
 The Bow Echo: Observations, Numerical Simulations, and Severe Weather Detection Methods (WAF)
 Strange storm broke the whole city in 1674

Radar meteorology
Storm
Severe weather and convection
Weather hazards

ja:気象レーダー#ボウエコー